The 2010–11 Moldovan "A" Division season was the 20th since its establishment. A total of 16 teams contested the league. No promotees were declared eligible at the end of the season, as none of the first four placed teams met the requirements for a National Division license.

Stadiums and locations

League table

References

External links
 Divizia A - Results, fixtures, tables and news - Soccerway
 Divizia Naţională - Divizia A 2010/11 - Rezultate

Moldovan Liga 1 seasons
2010–11 in Moldovan football
Moldova